Rupert Kettle may refer to:

 Rupert Kettle (cricketer) (1915–1985), English cricketer 
 Rupert Alfred Kettle (1817–1894), English barrister and county court judge